Paul Cole Chiori (also known as Ossy Achievas) is a Nigerian media entrepreneur and music executive. He is the founder of Achievas Entertainment. He is also an UN Peace Ambassador.

Early life and career 
Ossy was born in Lagos, Nigeria, and grew up in Ajegunle, Lagos. He started Achievas Entertainment in 2006 and signed Solid Star for 10 years. He also organized and promoted through his company Achievas Entertainment, Olamide's live in concert 2014-2016, Burna Boy Live 2018 and the Davido's 30BG concert 2017 in Lagos.

In 2018, his company exclusively produced a movie titled - The Island.

He also announced the launch of the Naija Social Media Awards in partnership with TV host, Emma Ugolee.

In 2019 his entertainment company Achievas Entertainment organised a premium luxurious event which also included a fashion runway show supervised by Stephanie Aleye Chiori and it was hosted by Ayo Makun, Nancy Isime amongst others and through the concert launched a new entertainment outfit called Premium Lagos.

Philanthropy and awards 
Ossy launched The Richout Foundation in 2018 to assist the less privileged and widows.

References 

Nigerian businesspeople
Living people
Year of birth missing (living people)